Majel Barrett-Roddenberry (born Majel Leigh Hudec; February 23, 1932 – December 18, 2008) was an American actress and producer. She was best known for her roles as various characters in the Star Trek franchise: Nurse Christine Chapel (in the original Star Trek series, Star Trek: The Animated Series, and two films of the franchise), Number One (also in the original series), Lwaxana Troi (on Star Trek: The Next Generation and Star Trek: Deep Space Nine), and the voice of most onboard computer interfaces throughout the series from 1966 to 2009. She married Star Trek creator Gene Roddenberry in 1969. As his wife and given her relationship with Star Trekparticipating in some way in every series during her lifetimeshe was sometimes referred to as "the First Lady of Star Trek".

Early life
Barrett was born in Cleveland, Ohio. She began taking acting classes as a child. She attended Shaker Heights High School, graduating in 1950 before going on to the University of Miami in Coral Gables, Florida, then had some stage roles and came to Hollywood. Her father, William Hudec, was a Cleveland police officer. He was killed in the line of duty on August 30, 1955 while Barrett was touring with an off-Broadway road company.

Career
Barrett was briefly seen in Will Success Spoil Rock Hunter? (1957) in an ad parody at the beginning of the film, and had roles in a few films, including Love in a Goldfish Bowl (1961), Sylvia (1965), A Guide for the Married Man (1967), and Track of Thunder (1967). She worked at the Desilu Studios on several TV shows, including Bonanza, The Untouchables, The Lucy Show, and The Lieutenant (produced by Gene Roddenberry). She received training in comedy from Lucille Ball. In 1960, she played Gwen Rutherford on Leave It to Beaver.

Star Trek
In various roles, Barrett participated in every incarnation of the popular science fiction Star Trek franchise produced during her lifetime, including live-action and animated versions, television and cinema, and all of the time periods in which the various series have been set.

She first appeared in Star Trek's initial pilot, "The Cage" (1964), as the USS Enterprise's unnamed first officer, "Number One". Barrett was romantically involved with Roddenberry, whose marriage was on the verge of failing at the time, and the idea of having an otherwise unknown woman in a leading role just because she was the producer's girlfriend is said to have infuriated NBC network executives who insisted that Roddenberry give the role to a man. William Shatner corroborated this in Star Trek Memories, and added that female viewers at test screenings hated the character as well. Shatner noted that female viewers felt she was "pushy" and "annoying" and also thought that "Number One shouldn't be trying so hard to fit in with the men." Barrett often joked that Roddenberry, given the choice between keeping Mr. Spock (whom the network also hated) or the woman character, "kept the Vulcan and married the woman, 'cause he didn't think Leonard [Nimoy] would have it the other way around".

When Roddenberry was casting for the second Star Trek pilot, "Where No Man Has Gone Before", she changed her last name from Hudec to Barrett and wore a blonde wig for the role of nurse Christine Chapel, a frequently recurring character, who was introduced in "The Naked Time", the sixth new episode recorded, and was known for her unrequited affection for the dispassionate Spock. Her first appearance as Chapel in film dailies prompted NBC executive Jerry Stanley to yodel "Well, well—look who's back!". In an early scene in Star Trek: The Motion Picture, viewers are informed that she has now become Doctor Chapel, a role which she reprised briefly in Star Trek IV: The Voyage Home, as Commander Chapel. Barrett provided several voices for Star Trek: The Animated Series, including those of Nurse Chapel and a communications officer named M'Ress, an ailuroid officer who served alongside Uhura.

Barrett returned years later in Star Trek: The Next Generation, cast as the outrageously self-assertive, iconoclastic, Betazoid ambassador, Lwaxana Troi, who appeared as a recurring character in the series, often visiting her daughter Deanna, the ship's counselor. Her character often vexed the captain of the Enterprise, Jean-Luc Picard, who spurned her amorous advances. She later appeared as Ambassador Troi in several episodes of Star Trek: Deep Space Nine, where her character developed a strong relationship with Constable Odo.

She provided the regular voice of the onboard computers of Federation starships for Star Trek: The Original Series, Star Trek: The Next Generation, Star Trek: Deep Space Nine, Star Trek: Voyager, and most of the Star Trek movies. She reprised her role as a shipboard computer's voice in two episodes of the prequel series Star Trek: Enterprise, thus making her the only actor to have a role in all six televised Star Trek series produced up to that time. She also lent her voice to various computer games and software related to the franchise. The association of her voice with interactions with computers led to Google's Assistant project being initially codenamed Google Majel. Barrett had also made a point of attending a major Star Trek convention each year in an effort to inspire fans and keep the franchise alive.

On December 9, 2008, less than ten days before her death, Roddenberry Productions announced that she would be providing the voice of the ship's computer once again, this time for the 2009 motion picture reboot of Star Trek. Sean Rossall, a Roddenberry family spokesman, stated that she had already completed the voiceover work, around December 4, 2008. The film is dedicated to Roddenberry and Barrett.

Other roles

She appeared as Primus Dominic in Roddenberry's 1973 postapocalyptic TV drama pilot, Genesis II; as Dr. Bradley in his 1974 television film The Questor Tapes and as Lilith the housekeeper in his 1977 TV drama pilot, Spectre. She also appeared in Michael Crichton's 1973 sci-fi Western, Westworld as Miss Carrie, a robot brothel madam; the 1977 Stanley Kramer thriller The Domino Principle; and the 1979 television film The Man in the Santa Claus Suit starring Fred Astaire. Her later film appearances included small roles in Teresa's Tattoo (1994) and Mommy (1995).

After Gene Roddenberry's death, Barrett took material from his archives to bring two of his ideas into production. She was executive producer of Earth: Final Conflict (in which she also played the character Dr. Julianne Belman), and Andromeda. She also served as creative director for Gene Roddenberry's Lost Universe, a comic book series based on another archival Roddenberry concept.

In a gesture of goodwill between the creators of the Star Trek franchise and of Babylon 5, she appeared in the Babylon 5 episode "Point of No Return", as Lady Morella, the psychic widow of the Centauri emperor, a role which foreshadowed major plot elements in the series.

Parodying her voice work as the computer for the Star Trek series, Barrett performed as a guest voice on Family Guy as the voice of Stewie Griffin's ship's computer in the episode "Emission Impossible".

Barrett's widely recognized voice performance as the Star Trek computer inspired the Amazon Alexa interactive virtual assistant, according to its developer Toni Reid, although Barrett had no direct role in it.

Railroad voicework
The Southern Pacific Railroad used her voice talent  contained inside Harmon Electronics (of Grain Valley, MO) track-side defect detector devices, used in various locations west of the Mississippi River. When a defect is identified on the passing train, the system responds with her recorded voice announcing the defect location information to the train crew over the radio. In railroad forums and railroad radio monitoring groups, she was and is still referred to as the "SP Lady". However, with the implementation of newer hotbox detector technology, finding her voice today on working detectors is very rare. The hotbox detectors that had her voice installed in them were not upgradeable to the newer digital signaling requirements, and finding parts for them was difficult. Today, her voice is found on smaller regional railroads, usually only at dragging equipment locations, such as in California at milepost 24.6 on the Metrolink Lancaster line (under the I-5 and I-210 interchange in Sylmar), and in Oregon on the Portland & Western at milepost 746.5, near Lake Oswego. These voiced detectors remain because the lines were once owned by Southern Pacific, and because only two unchanging recorded messages are used, compared to the dynamic changing library used in hotbox detectors. The only major railroad that still uses her voice today is Union Pacific.

Initially, Guilford commissioned Majel to say "Guilford Rail System", and the recording was programmed into detectors across the railroad. Train crews and local rail enthusiasts dubbed the MBTA Andover detector with the nickname "Andover Annie". Both the Andover and Shirley detectors with Majel's voice were replaced between 2015 and 2017 respectively with General Electric brand detectors, which use a male voice.

In 2006–2007, just before Majel Barrett-Roddenberry died on December 18, 2008, the recently re-branded Pan Am Railways (formerly Guilford) was able to commission Majel one last time to say "Pan Am Railways" for their defect detectors. As of October 2020, Pan Am Railways still uses Majel Barrett-Roddenberry's voice for defect detectors at eight different locations between Maine, Massachusetts, and Upstate New York.

Pan Am Railways defect detectors that still utilize Barrett's voice recordings include the following locations: In District 1, MP 134.1 in Readfield, Maine, just off of Plains Road crossing. Second is MP 157.2 in Lewiston, Maine, just off of Merrill Road crossing. Lastly, MP 176.7 in Gray, Maine, just off of Depot Road crossing. In District 2, only one detector with her voice is in service. MP 234.2 in North Berwick, Maine, just off of Elm Street/Route 4 crossing. In District 3, there are four locations that still utilize her voice. First, MP 346.6 in Gardner, Massachusetts, near Parkers Street underpass. Second is at MP 369.1 in Wendell, Massachusetts, just off of Wendell Depot Road crossing. Third is at MP 410.9 in Zoar, Massachusetts, paralleling Zoar Road. Finally, at MP 440.2 in Hoosick, New York. The future of these defect detectors remains uncertain with the current state of Pan Am Railways being for sale. If a new railroad takes over, these rare defect detectors will likely be replaced.

Final voiceover work
Some of Barrett's final voiceover work was still in post-production, to be released in 2009 after her death, as mentioned in the credits of the 2009 film Star Trek, again as the voice of the Enterprise computer. An animated production called Hamlet A.D.D. credited her as Majel Barrett Roddenberry, playing the voiceover role of Queen Robot.

Personal life and death

In 1969, while scouting locations in Japan for MGM, Roddenberry claimed that he realized that he missed Barrett, and proposed to her by telephone. In the version recited by Herbert F. Solow, Roddenberry traveled to Japan with the intention of marrying Barrett. She subsequently joined Roddenberry in Tokyo, where they were married in a Shinto ceremony on August 6, 1969. Roddenberry had considered it "sacrilegious" to use an American minister in Japan, and the ceremony was attended by two Shinto priests, as well as maids of honor. Roddenberry and Barrett both wore kimono, and spent their honeymoon touring Japan. He continued to have liaisons with other women, telling his friends that, while in Japan, he had an encounter with a masseuse about a week after he was married.

The new marriage was not legally binding, as his divorce from Eileen had not yet been finalized. This was resolved two days after his divorce was complete, and on December 29, a small ceremony was held at their home, followed by a reception for family and friends. Despite this, the couple continued to celebrate August 6 as their wedding anniversary. Roddenberry's young daughter, Dawn, decided to live with Barrett and him, and the family moved to a new house in Beverly Hills the following October. In February 1974, Barrett and Roddenberry had a son, Eugene Jr., commonly referred to as Rod Roddenberry. They remained married until Roddenberry's death at Barrett's side on October 24, 1991, in Santa Monica, California.

After her husband's death, Barrett-Roddenberry commissioned Celestis to launch her together with Gene on an infinite mission to deepest space. After manifesting them on NASA's "Sunjammer" mission, the agency cancelled the mission in 2014. Celestis rescheduled their launch for 2020, then later rescheduled for June 2022, the next available commercial mission to deep space. A sample of the couple's cremated remains will be sealed into a specially made capsule designed to withstand space travel. A spacecraft will carry the capsule, along with digitized tributes from fans, on Celestis' "Enterprise Flight". The flight will also contain the ashes of Nichelle Nichols and Douglas Trumbull.

Barrett-Roddenberry died on the morning of December 18, 2008, at her home in Bel Air, Los Angeles, California, as a result of leukemia. She was 76 years old. A public funeral was held on January 4, 2009, in Los Angeles. More than 250 people attended, including Nichelle Nichols, George Takei, Walter Koenig, Marina Sirtis, Brent Spiner and Wil Wheaton.

Honors
Barrett and her husband were honored in 2002 by the Space Foundation with the Douglas S. Morrow Public Outreach Award for their work creating awareness of and enthusiasm for space.

Filmography

Film

Television

References

Notes

Citations

Sources

External links

 
 

 AP Obituary in the Los Angeles Times

1932 births
2008 deaths
Actresses from Cleveland
American film actresses
American television actresses
Television producers from Ohio
American voice actresses
Audiobook narrators
Deaths from cancer in California
Deaths from leukemia
Gene Roddenberry
University of Miami alumni
American women film producers
Film producers from Ohio
20th-century American actresses
American women television producers
Space burials